V70 may refer to :
 NEC V70, an improved version of the NEC V60 CPU
 Volvo V70, an executive station wagon / estate made by Volvo Cars